Franciscus Accursius (1225–1293) was an Italian lawyer, the son of the celebrated jurist and glossator Accursius. The two are often confused.

Born in Bologna, Franciscus was more distinguished for his tact than for his wisdom. Edward I of England, returning from Palestine, brought him with him to England. The king invited him to Oxford, and he lived in the former Beaumont Palace, (in today's Beaumont Street), in Oxford.

In 1275 or 1276 he read lectures on law in the university. He acted as King's Secretary in the late 1270s until returning to Bologna in 1282, practicing law there until his death.

Dante (a contemporary) places Franciscus Accursius in Hell among the sodomites (Inferno XV, 110). The tomb of his father and himself in Bologna bears the inscription: "Sepulchrum Accursii, glossatoris legum, et Francisci, ejus filii."

References

External links
Works of Franciscus Accursius at ParalipomenaIuris

1225 births
1293 deaths
Jurists from Bologna
Burials at San Francesco (Bologna)
13th-century Italian jurists
Characters in the Divine Comedy